Booyong is a common name for Argyrodendron, a genus of plants

"Booyong" may also refer to:
Argyrodendron trifoliolatum, a species of the genus
Booyong, New South Wales, a locality in New South Wales, Australia
Booyong Flora Reserve, a protected area in Booyong